Parliamentary elections were held in Iceland on 27 October 1923. Voters elected all 28 seats in the Lower House of the Althing and eight of the fourteen seats in Upper House. The Citizens' Party, a loose collection of conservatives, emerged as the largest party in the Lower House, winning 16 of the 28 seats.

Electoral system
This was the first election held following changes made to the electoral system in 1920, in which two extra seats were allocated to Reykjavík. Whilst all seats had previously been elected in one or two-member constituencies, the four-member constituency for Reykjavík was now elected by proportional representation using the D'Hondt method.

The changes also equalised the age limits for voting between men (25) and women and servants (previously 40) at 25.

Results

Notes

References

Elections in Iceland
Iceland
Parliament
Iceland